

Selections

Notes
1.All players entering the draft are Filipinos until proven otherwise.

References

Philippine Basketball Association draft